KSLB may refer to:

Kerala State Land Bank
Storm Lake Municipal Airport in Storm Lake, Iowa, United States